The LAIM (Log Anonymization and Information Management) Working Group is a NSF and ONR funded research group at the National Center for Supercomputing Applications under the direction of Adam Slagell. Work from this group focuses upon log anonymization and Internet privacy. The LAIM group, established in 2005, has released 3 different log anonymization tools: CANINE, Scrub-PA, and FLAIM. FLAIM is their only tool still under active development.

External links 
 LAIM Working Group Official Home
 CANINE Home Page
 Scrub-PA Home Page
 Official FLAIM Home Page
 CRAWDAD entry on FLAIM at Dartmouth

Anonymity
Computer security organizations
Internet privacy organizations
Privacy organizations
Organizations established in 2005